Parvez Rob (1962/63 – 5 September 2019) was a Bangladeshi composer and music director. He was the music director of 75 films. His father Abdur Rob was an MNA in Pakistan period and his cousin Apel Mahmood is a singer and music composer.

Rob was the founding organizing secretary of Bangladesh Cultural Council. He died on 5 September 2019 at the age of 56 by road accident.

References

1960s births
2019 deaths
Bangladeshi composers
Bangladeshi music directors
Road incident deaths in Bangladesh